Mount Murray, is a 1,802-metre (5,912-feet) in the Murray Range of Hart Ranges of Northern British Columbia.  The mountain is within the Pine-Lemoray Provincial Park.

Named after N.F. Murray, who in 1915 with G.V. Copley, had conducted the first detailed survey and timber reconnaissance in the area for the British Columbia Forest Service. Murray enlisted with the CEF in 1916 and was killed at the Battle of Vimy Ridge in 1917.

There is a 8.2 kilometre hiking trail to the summit from Highway 97.

References 

Canadian Rockies
Northern Interior of British Columbia
One-thousanders of British Columbia
Peace River Land District